Melanopsis brevicula is a small species of gastropod endemic to small streams near Agourai, Morocco. It is distinctive due to its minute size, flattened sculpture, low spire, and small aperture. It is known from a single location 10 km2 in area (Oued Ain Maarouf) which has been well surveyed, and found to be threatened by increasing human population, droughts of increasing extremity, water diversion, and pastoralization. Shell collecting presents a minor threat to populations. The species has been classified as Critically endangered by the IUCN.

References 

Melanopsidae
Molluscs of Africa
Gastropods described in 1918